S. Sadasivam was an Indian politician and former Member of the Legislative Assembly of Tamil Nadu. He was elected to the Tamil Nadu legislative assembly as an Indian National Congress candidate from Aravakurichi constituency in 1957, 1962, and 1977 elections.

References 

Indian National Congress politicians from Tamil Nadu
Living people
Year of birth missing (living people)
Tamil Nadu MLAs 1977–1980
Madras MLAs 1962–1967
Madras MLAs 1957–1962